Hebius concelarus  is a species of snake of the family Colubridae. The snake is found on the Ryukyu Islands.

References 

concelarus
Reptiles of Japan
Reptiles described in 1963